HCS Strombolo (or Stromboli) was a ketch launched in 1793 Bombay Dockyard for the Bombay Marine. Later she became a floating battery at Salsette Harbour, having been condemned as unseaworthy. 

Still, she was pressed into service and sailed from Bombay in 1809 as part of an expedition against the pirates in the Persian Gulf. She foundered on 18 September or 15 October between Bombay and Gujarat while under tow by the British East India Company's cruizer Mornington. Her bottom dropped out and she sank quickly, taking with her all her stores and most of her officers and crew. Boats from Morington succeeded in rescuing her commander Lieutenant Hall, and 16 crew members; the rest drowned. Another report gives the loss of lives as 2 officers and 14 men.

Citations and references
Citations

References
 
 
 

1793 ships
British ships built in India
Ships of the Bombay Marine
Maritime incidents in 1809